Ricky Rainey (born June 29, 1983) is an American mixed martial artist. A professional competitor since 2011, Rainey has previously competed for Bellator and in the UFC's Welterweight division.

Mixed martial arts career

Early career
After compiling a 5-0 amateur record, Rainey made his professional mixed martial arts debut in August 2011. By September 2013, he held an 8–2 record competing for various promotions, most notably Xtreme Fighting Championships. After a loss to Dhiego Lima, Rainey signed with Bellator MMA.

Bellator MMA
On April 11, 2014, Rainey made his debut for Bellator against Andy Murad at Bellator 116. He won the fight in the first round via TKO.

Rainey faced undefeated Michael Page on Bellator's inaugural pay-per-view, Bellator 120, on May 17, 2014. He lost the fight via TKO in the first round.

Rainey faced Johnny Cisneros on October 3, 2014, at Bellator 127. He won the fight via TKO in the first round.

Rainey faced Jesse Juarez on May 15, 2015, at Bellator 137. He won the fight via knockout in the second round.

Rainey faced Chidi Njokuani at Bellator 146 on November 20, 2015.  He lost the fight via unanimous decision.

Rainey faced Gilbert Smith at Bellator 162 on October 21, 2016. He won the fight via unanimous decision.

Rainey faced Marc Stevens at Bellator 182 on August 25, 2017. He won the fight by unanimous decision.

Ultimate Fighting Championship 
Rainey faced Muslim Salikhov on April 14, 2018, at UFC on Fox 29, replacing Abdul Razak Alhassan who was removed from the card due to injury. He lost the fight via knockout in round two.

Rainey faced Tim Means on November 30, 2018, at The Ultimate Fighter 28 Finale. He lost the fight via a technical knockout in round one.

Rainey was released by UFC in July 2019.

Mixed martial arts record

|-
|Loss
|align=center|13–6
|Tim Means
|TKO (punches)
|The Ultimate Fighter: Heavy Hitters Finale 
|
|align=center|1
|align=center|1:18
|Las Vegas, Nevada, United States
|   
|- 
|Loss
|align=center|13–5
|Muslim Salikhov
|KO (punches)
|UFC on Fox: Poirier vs. Gaethje
|
|align=center|2
|align=center|4:12
|Glendale, Arizona, United States
|
|-
|Win
|align=center|13–4
|Marc Stevens
|Decision (unanimous)
|Bellator 182
|
|align=center|3
|align=center|5:00
|Verona, New York, United States
|
|-
|Win
|align=center|12–4
|Gilbert Smith
|Decision (unanimous)
|Bellator 162
|
|align=center|3
|align=center|5:00
|Memphis, Tennessee, United States
|
|-
|Loss
|align=center|11–4
|Chidi Njokuani
|Decision (unanimous)
|Bellator 146
|
|align=center|3
|align=center|5:00
|Thackerville, Oklahoma, United States
|
|-
|Win
|align=center|11–3
|Jesse Juarez
|KO (knee)
|Bellator 137
|
|align=center|2
|align=center|1:13
|Temecula, California, United States
|
|-
|Win
|align=center|10–3
|Johnny Cisneros
|TKO (knee and punches)
|Bellator 127
|
|align=center|1
|align=center|3:18
|Temecula, California, United States
|
|-
|Loss
|align=center|9–3
|Michael Page
|TKO (punch)
|Bellator 120
|
|align=center|1
|align=center|4:29
|Southaven, Mississippi, United States
|
|-
|Win
|align=center|9–2
|Andy Murad
|TKO (punches)
|Bellator 116
|
|align=center|1
|align=center|1:11
|Temecula, California, United States
|
|-
|Loss
|align=center|8–2
|Dhiego Lima
|Decision (split)
|XFC 25: Boiling Point
|
|align=center|3
|align=center|5:00
|Albuquerque, New Mexico, United States
|
|-
|Win
|align=center|8–1
|Reggie Peña
|TKO (punches)
|XFC 24: Collision Course
|
|align=center|1
|align=center|4:33
|Tampa, Florida, United States
|
|-
|Win
|align=center|7–1
|Alex Rojas
|Decision (unanimous)
|FLP 31: Fight Lab 31
|
|align=center|3
|align=center|5:00
|Charlotte, North Carolina, United States
|
|-
|Win
|align=center|6–1
|Joseph Corneroli
|Decision (unanimous)
|XFC 22: Crossing the Line
|
|align=center|3
|align=center|5:00
|Charlotte, North Carolina, United States
|
|-
|Win
|align=center|5–1
|Donald Wallace
|TKO (knee and punches)
|XFC 21: Night of Champions II
|
|align=center|1
|align=center|1:42
|Nashville, Tennessee, United States
|
|-
|Loss
|align=center|4–1
|Johnny Buck
|KO (punches)
|XFC 19: Charlotte Showdown
|
|align=center|2
|align=center|1:32
|Charlotte, North Carolina, United States
|
|-
|Win
|align=center|4–0
|Patrick Mandio
|Decision (unanimous)
|Wild Bill's Fight Night 44
|
|align=center|3
|align=center|5:00
|Duluth, Georgia, United States
|
|-
|Win
|align=center|3–0
|Elder Ramos
|TKO (punches)
|AMMAFL 4: Fight Night
|
|align=center|1
|align=center|3:52
|Newtown, Pennsylvania, United States
|
|-
|Win
|align=center|2–0
|Tommy Jones
|Submission (rear-naked choke)
|Wild Bill's Fight Night 41
|
|align=center|3
|align=center|2:46
|Duluth, Georgia, United States
|
|-
|Win
|align=center|1–0
|John Constantonus
|KO (punch)
|Fight Lab 16: MMA Cage Fights
|
|align=center|1
|align=center|3:26
|Charlotte, North Carolina, United States
|

References

External links
 
 

1983 births
Living people
American male mixed martial artists
Welterweight mixed martial artists
People from Gastonia, North Carolina
Mixed martial artists from North Carolina
Ultimate Fighting Championship male fighters